Badminton at the 2020 Summer Paralympics in Tokyo, Japan, was played at the Yoyogi National Gymnasium (renamed to Yoyogi National Stadium for the Games) from 1 to 5 September 2021. There were a total of fourteen events taking place: seven male events (six singles, one doubles), six female events (four singles, two doubles) and one mixed doubles event.

The 2020 Summer Olympic and Paralympic Games were postponed to 2021 due to the COVID-19 pandemic. They kept the 2020 name and were held from 24 August to 5 September 2021.

Classification
There were six different classes in the competition.

Qualification

Schedule

Participating nations

 (Host nation)

Medal table

Medalists

Singles events

Doubles events

References

External links
Results book 

2020 Summer Paralympics events
Badminton tournaments in Japan
Para-badminton
2020
Paralympics